Midnattsrocken is a festival rich in tradition, first arranged in 1984. It takes place every year on the very top of Norway, just outside the village of Lakselv. The festival area is beautifully located innermost in the Porsanger fjord, only some 190 km from the famous North Cape plateau.

The Midnattsrocken festival was first arranged during the summer of 1984. Since then many great artists both domestic and international have performed on the stage at Brennelvneset, located innermost in the Porsanger fjord in the county of Finnmark. The festival has evolved into the largest outdoor music festival in the counties of Finnmark and Northern Troms.

Midnattsrocken is an outdoor music festival. The festival area is located just outside the village of Lakselv, in the very heart of Finnmark (Norway's northernmost county). Surrounded by a beach, a river, mountains and the Porsanger fjord, we like to call it the most exotic festival area in the world.

The audience record for Midnattsrocken is over 11.000 (2009). This is almost 15 percent of Finnmark's total population.

Midnattsrocken has its own festival camp.

History

Since the very beginning in 1984 famous artists such as N.E.R.D (2010), Kent (2010), Dum Dum Boys (2010), Queensrÿche (2010), D.A.D (2010), Deep Purple, Twisted Sister, CC Cowboys, Turboneger, Imperiet, Kim Larsen, Wannskræk (Dum Dum Boys), Mari Boine, Fish, Kamelot, Åge Aleksandersen, Postgirobygget, Briskeby and more have all taken part in The Midnattsrocken festival and given the population in this remote part of the country great musical experiences.

In the 80's Midnattsrocken was one of the largest outdoor music festivals throughout the country. The festival was arranged for the first time during the summer of 1984. Due to large deficits the 1989 festival marked the end of the Midnattsrocken festivals.

In 2001 Midnattsrocken was reintroduced. Since then it has been arranged every year (except 2002) in Brennelvneset innermost in the Porsanger Fjord.

The new initiators had to reflect well upon the whole concept. As a result, a festival camp was introduced. This led to an increase in the number of visitors.

Once again the Midnattsrocken festival plays an important role among the festivals in the northern part of Norway. It is now the largest outdoor music festival in the counties of Finnmark and Northern Troms.

Concept

Midnattsrocken is to be a music festival offering a wide range of music – for people of all ages.

The background for our choice of concept is:
- This region offers a very limited amount of musical events
- It is very rare to have popular artists/bands visit this part of the country
- The potential spectator numbers for musical events in this region is limited

The Midnattsrocken festival focuses primarily on the counties of Finnmark and Northern Troms. The total population in this area is only about 85000. In addition the settlement is spread over a vast geographical area. This makes it necessary to offer a wide range of music to be able to attract enough spectators for the festival to be economically viable.

Different concepts have been tried out since the Midnattsrocken festival was first arranged during 1984. All conclusions and experiences support today's concept.

The Midnattsrocken festival is an outdoor music festival arranged on the outskirts of the village of Lakselv in Porsanger municipality. In addition to what the festival offers from a musical perspective, it has a very popular festival camp.

Ownership and organization

Since the 80's several different organizations have been in charge of the festival, and it has been through many adjustment periods.

To create continuity, the Midnattsrocken festival has since 2005 been organized as a society. The ownership of the festival is connected with this society.

The society of the Midnattsrocken festival is the disciplinarian organizer of the festival. All technical support in conjunction with the festival is outsourced to commercial partners with the necessary capacity and proficiency within the relevant fields.

References 

Midnattsrocken website (English and Norwegian)

Music festivals in Norway